Eli Wachtel was the Managing Director of Bear Stearns. 
He is a graduate of NYIT

References

New York Institute of Technology alumni
American business executives
Living people
Year of birth missing (living people)
Place of birth missing (living people)